Alfred Price (1838–1907) was a New Zealand manufacturing engineer. He was born in France Lynch, Gloucestershire, England in 1838.

References

1838 births
1907 deaths
People from Chalford
English emigrants to New Zealand
19th-century New Zealand engineers
20th-century New Zealand engineers